Pedro de Silva formed the first cabinet in 1983 after becoming the first President of the Principality of Asturias elected democratically. He was nominated again in 1987.

First De Silva government (1983–1987)

The De Silvafirst  government was the regional government of Asturias led by President Pedro de Silva, the first democratically elected one.

Investiture

Composition

Second De Silva government (1987–1991)

The De Silva government second was the regional government of Asturias led by President Pedro de Silva between 1987 and 1991.

Investiture

Composition

References

Cabinets of Asturias
Cabinets established in 1983